Daryl Lambert (born 8 October 1946) is an Australian cricketer. He played in six first-class matches for South Australia between 1976 and 1978.

See also
 List of South Australian representative cricketers

References

External links
 

1946 births
Living people
Australian cricketers
South Australia cricketers
Cricketers from Adelaide